Kathirunda Kadhal is a 1997 Indian Tamil-language film directed by Vijayeswaran and produced by Ganga Gowri Productions. The film featured Arun Kumar alongside Suvalakshmi, while Dimple plays a supporting roles. The film, which had music composed by Sirpy, opened in January 1997.

Cast
Arun Kumar as Mayilsamy
Suvalakshmi
Dimple
Nizhalgal Ravi
Jaishankar
Charle
Malaysia Vasudevan
Vizhuthugal Latha

Soundtrack
The music was composed by Sirpy.

Release
The film opened in January 1997 to poor reviews from critics and fared poorly at the box office.

References

1997 films
1990s Tamil-language films